CCGS D'Iberville was a Canadian Coast Guard icebreaker that was in service from 1952 to 1983 and was Canada's first modern icebreaker. The ship commissioned as CGS D'Iberville for the Department of Transport's Marine Service, using the prefix "Canadian Government Ship", D'Iberville was transferred into the newly-created Canadian Coast Guard in 1962. When launched, she was the largest icebreaker in use by Canada post-World War II until  was put in service. In 1984, the icebreaker was renamed Phillip O'Hara before returning to her old name in 1988. In 1989 the vessel was sold for scrap and broken up at Kaohsiung, Taiwan.

Design and description
The ship was propelled by two screws powered by two six-cylinder Skinner uniflow steam engines creating . The ship had a hangar as part of the superstructure that could hold two Bell 47 helicopters and a flight deck over the stern of the ship, but usually only operated one helicopter.

Service history
The icebreaker was constructed by Davie Shipbuilding at their yard in Lauzon, Quebec, with the yard number 590 and was launched on 12 June 1952. The vessel entered into service with the Department of Transport's Marine Service as CGS D'Iberville in May 1953, named for the French explorer Pierre Le Moyne d'Iberville. Upon completion, D'Iberville became Canada's first modern icebreaker. Following completion of her sea trials, D'Iberville sailed to England as part of Canada's representation at Queen Elizabeth II's coronation review along with warships from the Royal Canadian Navy. The ship was based at Quebec City, Quebec and saw service in the St. Lawrence River and Gulf of St. Lawrence. 

In 1953, on the icebreaker's first Arctic voyage, D'Iberville helped establish the Royal Canadian Mounted Police post at Alexandria Fjord on Ellesmere Island. That year, D'Iberville and the Arctic patrol vessel  participated in the controversial forced resettlement of Inuit families from Port Harrison in Northern Quebec to Ellesmere Island. In 1962, like all icebreaking vessels of the Department of Transport's Marine Service, she was transferred to the newly created Canadian Coast Guard.

In 1972, D'Iberville was one of three icebreaking escorts for a convoy of cargo ships travelling to Mokka Fjord and Eureka. This was the largest convoy to travel that far north into Canada's Arctic. In 1981, D'Iberville made her last Arctic voyage. The ship was decommissioned in 1983. The vessel was laid up first at Quebec City, then at Sorel. Renamed Phillip O'Hara in 1984 and back to D'Iberville in 1988, the icebreaker was sold for scrap in 1989 and broken up at Kaoshiung, Taiwan.

References

Notes

Citations

Sources

External links
 Ships of the CCG 1850–1967

Icebreakers of the Canadian Coast Guard
1952 ships
Ships built in Quebec
Canadian Government Ship